Bernd Reichelt is a German politician. In the 1990 East German elections, he was elected to the Volkskammer (parliament of the GDR) on behalf of the Green Party.

References

1957 births
Living people
People from Zeitz
Members of the 10th Volkskammer